Parvati Prasad Baruva (1904–1964) was a noted poet, lyricist, and dramatist: an icon of Assamese literature and the culture of Assam.  Known for his simple and sensitive use of the Assamese language, he is popularly known as the Geetikavi; the lyrical poet of Assam.  He was also one of the early pioneering filmmakers of Assamese cinema.

Biography
He was born on 19 August 1904 near the banks of the Dikhow river in Sibsagar, Assam to Radhika Prasad Baruva and Himala Devi. Parvati Prasad's great-grandfather Jaduram Deka Baruva wrote the first bilingual Assamese dictionary in 1839.

Parvati Prasad graduated in philosophy from Kolkata's Scottish Church College as a graduating student of the University of Calcutta. During his sojourn in Kolkata, he would watch plays, dance dramas (or Rabindra Nritya Natyas) and other musical events based on the works of Rabindranath Tagore. These experiences helped to further hone his creativity as a music composer later.

Works
Parvati Prasad, at the age of ten, for the first time, played the part of 'Joymoti', in a play staged by the local theater group. In 1921, he started a hand written monthly magazine called Jhupitora.

Cinema
 He directed the fourth Assamese movie Rupohi which was released in 1941. He also composed the music for this film.

Poetry and music
 Bhonga Tukarir Sur (?):  book of poems
 Gungunani (?):  published book of songs; including Pujo Aha, Nobolo Tuk, and Tor Nai Je Bondhuwa Baat
 Luiti (?):  published book of bongeets about the river Luit; including Luitor Saporit Kore Naworiya
 Sukula Dawor Oi Kohuwa Phul (?):  published book of songs about the seasons of autumn (fall); including Sarodi Sandhiyar Jonaki Mel 
 Lakhhimi (?): dance drama
 Sonar Soleng (?): dance drama

Dramas
 ‘Lakhimi’ and
 ‘Sonar Soleng'.

Translations and awards
Baruwa's poetry has been translated into Hindi, English and may other Indian languages. English translation of his poems by Paromita Das under the titles "If Life Be Lost" and "Life Awakens" was conferred with Sahitya Akademi Golden Jubilee Literary Translation Award in 2007.

See also
 Assamese literature
 Music of Assam

References

Poets from Assam
People from Sivasagar
Dramatists and playwrights from Assam
1904 births
1964 deaths
Writers from Northeast India
Scottish Church College alumni
University of Calcutta alumni
20th-century Indian poets
20th-century Indian dramatists and playwrights
Writers from Assam